GVC may refer to:

 Den Haag Centraal railway station, in The Hague, Netherlands
 Main Computation Centre of the General Staff, a Russian military unit
 Gastrovascular cavity
 Genesee Valley Conservancy, an American land trust
 Girls Venture Corps Air Cadets, in the United Kingdom
 Global value chain
 Government Victoria College, Palakkad, Kerala, India
 Great Valley Center, in California, United States
 GVC Holdings, a Manx gambling company rebranded as Entain
 Wanano language, spoken in Brazil and Colombia